The 2002–03 Eredivisie season was the 43rd season of the Eredivisie, the top level of ice hockey in the Netherlands. Five teams participated in the league, and the Boretti Tigers Amsterdam won the championship.

Regular season

Phase 1

Phase 2

Phase 3

Phase 4

Playoffs

External links 
 Season on hockeyarchives.info

Neth
Eredivisie (ice hockey) seasons
Ere 
Ere